Thalamarchella alveola is a moth in the family Depressariidae. It was described by Cajetan Felder, Rudolf Felder and Alois Friedrich Rogenhofer in 1875. It is found in Australia, where it has been recorded from Western Australia.

References

Moths described in 1875
Thalamarchella